Sunity Devi CIE (30 September 1864 – 10 November 1932) was the Maharani of the princely state of Cooch Behar, British India.

Early life
She was a daughter of the renowned Brahmo Samaj reformist, Keshub Chandra Sen of Calcutta, and Jagonmohini Sen. She was married to Nripendra Narayan (1863-1911), the Maharaja of Cooch Behar in 1878, when she was only fourteen years of age. She stayed at her father's place for two years after marriage, as Narayan left for London for higher studies immediately after their marriage.

She was the mother of four sons and three daughters: sons Rajendra Narayan, Jitendra Narayan, Victor Nityendra Narayan, and Hitendra Narayan, and daughters Pratibha Devi, Sudhira Devi, and Sukriti Devi.

Her daughters Sudhira and Pratibha married two brothers, Alan and Miles Mander, of Wightwick Manor in England. The Manor is part of the National Trust and open to visit. Of her sons, Rajendra Narayan and Jitendra Narayan later became Maharajas of Cooch Behar. Gayatri Devi and Ila Devi were daughters of her son Jitendra Narayan Bhup Bahadur.

Work
In 1887, her husband, Nipendra Narayan was awarded GCIE and she was awarded CIE. Suniti Devi became the first Indian women to be awarded CIE. She attended the Diamond Jubilee celebrations of Queen Victoria in 1898 and Delhi Durbar of 1911 with her husband, the Maharaja of Cooch Behar. She along with her sister, the Sucharu Devi, were noted for their elegant style dressing.

Her husband had set up in her name a girls school named Suniti Academy in 1881 which was later named Suniti Academy. Suniti Devi was the brain behind the establishment of the school.

She was an educationalist and a women's rights activist at heart, gave annual grants for the institution, exempted the girl students from paying tuition fees and also rewarded the successful students. She had arranged for palace cars to ferry the girl students from home to school and back. In a further effort to avoid any controversy she ordered that the windows of the cars carrying the girls to school to be covered by curtains.

She along with her sister Sucharu Devi (Maharani of Mayurbhanj) also financed the foundation of Maharani Girls' High School at Darjeeling in 1908. She was the President of State Council and also the first President of All Bengal Women's Union in 1932 and worked along with other women's right activist from Bengal like Charulata Mukherjee, Saroj Nalini Dutt, T. R Nelly and her sister Sucharu Devi, the Maharani of Mayurbhanj.

She authored a book "The Beautiful Mogul Princesses", which was published in 1918 by W. Thacker & Co. 2, Creed Lane, Ludgate Hill, London. This book contains the intimate life stories of the Mogul Princesses Mumtaza Mahal, Reba, Zebunnissa and Nurjahan. She also authored a book "Bengal Dacoits and Tigers" published in 1916 by Thacker, Spink and Company, Calcutta.

She died suddenly in the year 1932 at Ranchi.

Titles
1887 - Companion of the Order of the Crown of India on the occasion of her attending with her husband Nripendra Narayan, the Golden jubilee celebration of Queen Victoria.

Legacy
A road in her home town, Cooch Behar is named Sunity Road after her.

References

External links

 
Sunity Devee (1921), The Autobiography of an Indian Princess, London: J. Murray, on the Internet Archive

1932 deaths
1864 births
Indian female royalty
Queen mothers
Companions of the Order of the Crown of India
People buried at Brahmo Cemetery, Nabodebalaya
People from Kolkata
Indian women's rights activists
Indian women educational theorists
Founders of Indian schools and colleges
Indian women philanthropists
Indian philanthropists
Bengali scientists
Bengali Hindus
19th-century women educators
20th-century women educators
Indian queen consorts
Educationists from India
20th-century Indian educators
19th-century Indian educators
Indian educators
Indian women educators
Indian educational theorists
20th-century Indian educational theorists
19th-century Indian educational theorists
Indian reformers
Indian social reformers
Indian social workers
Social workers from West Bengal
Activists from West Bengal
Indian activists
Indian women activists
Indian feminists
Indian feminist writers
Indian non-fiction writers